DeVan "Van" Dallas (March 4, 1926 – November 4, 2016) was an American politician in the state of Mississippi. He served in the Mississippi House of Representatives from 1964 to 1976. Dallas was an automobile and farm equipment dealer. He attended Troy Grammar School and Pontotoc High School. Dallas served in the United States Navy from 1944 to 1946, partaking in World War II. From 1972 to 1976, he sat on the Mississippi State Sovereignty Commission, among other various boards.

References

1926 births
2016 deaths
People from Okolona, Mississippi
People from Pontotoc, Mississippi
Military personnel from Mississippi
Businesspeople from Mississippi
Democratic Party members of the Mississippi House of Representatives
20th-century American businesspeople
United States Navy personnel of World War II